Al-Katib or al-Katib is an Arabic surname that denotes a relationship to a Katib. Notable people with the surname include:
 Abd al-Hamid al-Katib (died 749), Medieval Arabic-language writer
 Al-Hasan al-Katib (d. 11th century), Egyptian Sufi saint
 Ibrahim ibn Wahb al-Katib (10th-century), scholar of the Abbasid Caliphate
 Marjan al-Katib al-Islami (17th century), Iranian calligrapher
 Muhammad ibn Sulayman al-Katib (died after 905), senior official and commander of the Abbasid Caliphate
 Yunus al-Katib al-Mughanni (8th-century), Persian-language poet

Arabic-language surnames
Surnames of Iranian origin
Surnames of Kuwaiti origin
Surnames of Egyptian origin